Carex aperta, known as Columbian sedge, is a species of sedge that was first described by Francis Boott in 1839. It is native to eastern Russia, northern China, western Canada, and the northwestern United States. It grows in wet meadows, along shorelines, and in other wet habitats.

References

aperta